Anthony Mendleson (7 February 1915 – 5 September 1996) was a British costume and set designer. He was nominated for the Academy Award for Best Costume Design in 1972 for Young Winston, and in 1976 for The Incredible Sarah.

He was born on 7 February 1915 in Chiswick, London and died in London on 5 September 1996.

Filmography (as costume designer)

 Passport to Pimlico (1949)
 Kind Hearts and Coronets (1949)
 Train of Events (1949)
 A Run for Your Money (1949)
 The Blue Lamp (1950)
 Cage of Gold (1950)
 The Magnet (1950)
 Pool of London (1951)
 The Lavender Hill Mob (1951)
 The Man in the White Suit (1951)
 His Excellency (1952)
 Secret People (1952)
 I Believe in You (1952)
 Mandy (1952)
 The Gentle Gunman (1952)
 Meet Mr. Lucifer (1953)
 The Love Lottery (1954)
 The Ladykillers (1955)
 Who Done It? (1956)
 The Feminine Touch (1956)
 True as a Turtle (1957)
 Fortune Is a Woman (1957)
 The Smallest Show on Earth (1957)
 The One That Got Away (1957)
 Chase a Crooked Shadow (1958)
 Innocent Sinners (1958)
 Bachelor of Hearts (1958)
 Left Right and Centre (1959)
 The Mouse That Roared (1959)
 Follow a Star (1959)
 Make Mine Mink (1960)
 The Bulldog Breed (1960)
 Mr. Topaze (1961)
 A Matter of WHO (1961)
 She'll Have to Go (1962)
 Guns of Darkness (1962)
 Billy Budd (1962)
 The Mouse on the Moon (1963)
 The Man Who Finally Died (1963)
 The Moon-Spinners (1964)
 The Yellow Rolls-Royce (1964)
 The Fighting Prince of Donegal (1966)
 Pretty Polly (1967)
 The Magus (1968)
 Oh! What a Lovely War (1969)
 David Copperfield (1969)
 Jane Eyre (1970)
 Macbeth (1971)
 Young Winston (1972)
 Alice's Adventures in Wonderland (1972)
 The Black Windmill (1974)
 Persecution (1974)
 The Ghoul (1975)
 One of Our Dinosaurs Is Missing (1975)
 Mister Quilp (1975)
 The Incredible Sarah (1976)
 Gulliver's Travels (1977)
 A Bridge Too Far (1977)
 The Boys from Brazil (1978)
 The First Great Train Robbery (1979)
 Saturn 3 (1980)
 Rough Cut (1980)
 Dragonslayer (1981)
 Krull (1983)
 The Keep (1983)
 The Masks of Death (1984)

References

External links

1915 births
1996 deaths
British costume designers
Best Costume Design BAFTA Award winners
People from Chiswick